Piotr Jędraszczyk (born 9 October 2001) is a Polish handball player for Piotrkowianin Piotrków Trybunalski and the Polish national team.

References

2001 births
Living people
Sportspeople from Łódź
Polish male handball players
21st-century Polish people